Harri Lill (born 22 July 1991) is an Estonian curler and curling coach.

At the national level, he is a 2017 Estonian men's champion curler.

Teams

Men's

Mixed

Mixed doubles

Record as a coach of national teams

References

External links

Harri Lill - Postimees Sport: Värsked spordiuudised Eestist ja välismaalt
Harri Lill - Teemalehed - DELFI
Harri Lill, Author at Curling Tallinn
Harri Lill - ERR Sport

Video: 

Living people
1991 births

Estonian male curlers
Estonian curling champions
Estonian curling coaches
Place of birth missing (living people)